Chemung Township is the northwesternmost township of McHenry County, Illinois, United States.

It includes the bulk and northern part of the city of Harvard, as well as unincorporated communities: Big Foot Prairie (partly in Wisconsin), Lawrence, and Chemung.

As of the 2020 census, its population was 9,035 and it contained 3,294 housing units.

Geography

Demographics

References

External links
Chemung Township, IL
City-data.com
Illinois State Archives

Townships in McHenry County, Illinois
Townships in Illinois